The Florence Town Hall is located in the Town of Florence, Wisconsin.

History
The building was constructed as a Works Progress Administration project. In addition to municipal operations, it housed an auditorium for special events. The building was added to the State Register of Historic Places in 2013 and to the National Register of Historic Places the following year.

References

City and town halls on the National Register of Historic Places in Wisconsin
National Register of Historic Places in Florence County, Wisconsin
Auditoriums in the United States
Works Progress Administration in Wisconsin
Streamline Moderne architecture in Wisconsin
Brick buildings and structures
Government buildings completed in 1937